Bernd Dittert (born 6 February 1961) is a retired racing cyclist from East Germany who won the bronze medal for his native country in the men's 4,000m individual pursuit at the 1988 Summer Olympics in Seoul, South Korea. Four years later he won the gold medal in the men's team time trial (road), alongside Michael Rich, Christian Meyer and Uwe Peschel.

References

External links

 

1961 births
Living people
People from Genthin
East German male cyclists
German male cyclists
German track cyclists
Cyclists at the 1988 Summer Olympics
Cyclists at the 1992 Summer Olympics
Olympic cyclists of East Germany
Olympic cyclists of Germany
Olympic bronze medalists for East Germany
Olympic gold medalists for Germany
Olympic medalists in cycling
Cyclists from Saxony-Anhalt
Medalists at the 1992 Summer Olympics
Medalists at the 1988 Summer Olympics
People from Bezirk Magdeburg